Marietta is an unincorporated community in Hendricks Township, Shelby County, in the U.S. state of Indiana.

History
Marietta was platted in 1839. A post office was established at Marietta in 1848, and remained in operation until it was discontinued in 1904. Marietta once contained a high school which was discontinued at an unknown date.

Geography

References

Unincorporated communities in Shelby County, Indiana
Unincorporated communities in Indiana
Indianapolis metropolitan area